Breaktime is a young adult novel by Aidan Chambers. The book follows Ditto who debates with his friend Morgan about the value of literature, but has to retreat for a week to sort things out.

The novel has been described as "famous for its unique narrative style and sexual content", and its narrative techniques have been compared to those of James Joyce's Ulysses.

Reception
Kirkus Reviews praised "the ease with which Chambers adapts modernist experimental techniques and post-modernist plays on the conventions of fiction to an accessible YA level", and noted that Ditto was a "candid reporter, alert and responsive come-what-may".

References

1978 British novels
British young adult novels
Novels set in England
The Bodley Head books